Hypolaetin is a flavone. It is the aglycone of hypolaetin 8-glucuronide, a compound found in the liverwort Marchantia berteroana. Hypolaetin 8-glucoside can be found in Sideritis leucantha.

References 

Flavones